We as Human was an American Christian rock band originally from Sandpoint, Idaho, United States, formed in 2006. They were discovered by John Cooper, lead singer of the band Skillet, in 2010 who introduced them to Atlantic Records, their current label. They moved to Nashville, Tennessee in September 2011, where they resided until they disbanded. They have played shows with Avenged Sevenfold, Skillet, Korn, Alter Bridge, Papa Roach, and Shinedown. Their music has been accepted in both the Christian and mainstream rock markets.

As of 2016, former members Justin Forshaw and Jake Jones, with the help of music producer Robert Venable, formed a new band under the name As We Ascend, and with the help of a PledgeMusic campaign, released their debut album, Farewell to Midnight, on March 17, 2017.

History 
The band released their first album independently on September 20, 2006 entitled Until We're Dead. Next, the band released an independent EP called Burning Satellites EP. Then, they released their first major label debut EP in 2011 on Atlantic Records, which was called We as Human EP, and this charted at No. 35 on the Billboard Top Christian Albums chart and No. 27 on the Heatseekers Albums chart. The band signed to Atlantic Records, and then released their debut major record label album, We As Human, on June 25, 2013. It debuted at No. 3 on the Billboard Christian Albums chart and No. 8 on the Billboard Hard Rock charts. The song "Strike Back" was nominated for 2013 Best Rock Song of the Year Dove award as well as peaking at No. 20 on the Hot Mainstream Rock Tracks chart. The band charted their first No. 1 single in May 2014 with their song "Take the Bullets Away".

The band broke up in 2016 due to lead singer Justin Cordle's extramarital affair. In February 2016 on "Ruined Radio", a podcast by former members Justin Forshaw and Jake Jones, it was said that they, along with former drummer Brooks Holt (who later decided not to join), were continuing their career through a different name as Justin Cordle owns the rights to We as Human. Forshaw and Jones recently started a new band called As We Ascend.

Band members 
 Former

 Justin Cordle - vocals
 Adam Osborne - drums
 Dave Draggoo - bass, background vocals
 Jake Jones - rhythm guitar, background vocals
 Justin Forshaw - lead guitar
 Brooks Holt - drums

Discography 

 Until We're Dead (2006)
 We as Human (2013)

Awards

Tours

References

External links 
 
 CCM Magazine story
 Jesus Freak Hideout interview

Atlantic Records artists
Musical groups established in 2006
Musical groups disestablished in 2016
Musical groups from Nashville, Tennessee